The Jamo Fortress is a stone fortress dating from the Goryeo period. One of the National Treasures of North Korea, it is
located in Ojung-ni, Pyongsong, South Pyongan Province.

The fortress has a circumference of 451 m and a height of 2.7 m. It suffered damage during the Second Manchu invasion of Korea. Most of the fortress has been ruined due to wind and frost in the area. It has come to be known by various names over time, including Seongsanseong, Seongjaesanseong, Jamosanseong and Gadeungsanseong.

References 

National Treasures of North Korea
Castles in North Korea
Buildings and structures in South Pyongan Province